Karen Vi Plummer (born 14 September 1951) is a New Zealand former cricketer who played as an all-rounder, batting right-handed and bowling right-arm medium. She appeared in 4 Test matches and 11 One Day Internationals for New Zealand between 1982 and 1992. She also captained New Zealand during England's tour of the country in 1991–92. She played domestic cricket for North Shore and Auckland.

References

External links

1951 births
Living people
New Zealand women cricketers
New Zealand women Test cricketers
New Zealand women One Day International cricketers
New Zealand women's Test captains
New Zealand women's One Day International captains
North Shore women cricketers
Auckland Hearts cricketers
People educated at Westlake Girls High School